The Icaro Force is an Italian single-place, paraglider that was designed by Michael Nessler and Christian Amon and produced by Icaro 2000 of Sangiano. It is now out of production.

Design and development
The Force was designed as an intermediate glider. The models are each named for their relative size.

Variants
Force S
Small-sized model for lighter pilots. The glider model is DHV 1-2 certified.
Force M
Mid-sized model for medium-weight pilots. The glider model is DHV 1-2 certified.
Force L
Large-sized model for heavier pilots. The glider model is DHV 1-2 certified.

Specifications (Force M)

References

Force
Paragliders